8th Gaumee Film Awards ceremony, honored the best Maldivian films released between 2014 and 2016. The ceremony was held on 20 December 2017.

Winners and nominees

Main awards
Nominees were announced on 12 December 2017.

Technical awards

Short film

Special awards

See also
 Gaumee Film Awards

References

Gaumee Film Awards
2017 film awards
2017 in the Maldives
December 2017 events in Asia